Feelins' is the fifth collaborative studio album by Conway Twitty and Loretta Lynn. It was released on June 9, 1975, by MCA Records.

Critical reception

Billboard published a review in the June 21, 1975 issue that said, "Put them together and what do you have? A flock of hits, that's what. Loretta gets a little farther away from the traditional every time she sings, and Conway just keeps getting better and better. Together they are unbeatable. Great collection of songs, fine arrangements, that Owen Bradley touch in production, and another great album." The review noted "I'll Never Get Tired (Of Saying I Love You)", "Little Boy Love", "You Done Lost Your Baby", and "Some Kind of a Woman" as the best cuts on the album with a not to album dealers saying, "It's the hottest pair going."

The June 28, 1975 issue of Cashbox carried a review of the album which said, "Leading with their current hot single of the same title, the dynamic duo of Conway and Loretta entertain us with 10 more great songs. Vocals blend beautifully, as to be expected, guaranteeing them many more years of being the top country duo. Favorite cuts include "Dyn-o-mite", "I’ll Never Get Tired (Of Saying I Love You)", "You Done Lost Your Woman", and "Store Up Love"."

Commercial performance 
The album peaked at No. 1 on the US Billboard Hot Country LPs chart, the duo's third consecutive album to top the chart.

The album's only single, "Feelins'", was released in June 1975 and peaked at No. 1 on the Billboard Hot Country Singles chart, the duo's fifth and final single to top the chart. In Canada, the single peaked at No. 2 on the RPM Country Singles chart.

Recording 
Recording sessions for the album took place at Bradley's Barn in Mount Juliet, Tennessee, on April 1, 2, 23 and 24, 1975.

Track listing

Charts
Album

Singles

References 

1975 albums
Loretta Lynn albums
Conway Twitty albums
MCA Records albums